The Ilha do Ameixal Area of Relevant Ecological Interest is an area of relevant ecological interest in the state of São Paulo, Brazil.

Location

The Ilha do Ameixal Area of Relevant Ecological Interest (ARIE) lies in the municipality of Peruíbe, São Paulo.
The ARIE covers Ameixal island in the Una do Prelado River near its mouth on the Atlantic Ocean.
The Itinguçu State Park lies to the west, north and east of this section of the river, and the Barra do Una Sustainable Development Reserve lies to the south of the island.

Environment

The island is covered by mangrove vegetation.
It is in the Atlantic Forest biome.

History

The Ilha do Ameixal Area of Relevant Ecological Interest was created by presidential decree 91.889 of 5 November 1985.
It is administered by the federal Chico Mendes Institute for Biodiversity Conservation (ICMBio).
It is classed as IUCN protected area category IV (habitat/species management area).
The conservation unit is part of the Lagamar mosaic.

Notes

Sources

1985 establishments in Brazil
Areas of relevant ecological interest of Brazil
Protected areas of São Paulo (state)